Shiza Kichuya (born 5 August 1996) is a Tanzanian international football player.

Kichuya was named in the Tanzania squad for the 2017 COSAFA Cup and scored two goals against Malawi.

International career

International goals
Scores and results list Tanzania's goal tally first.

References

1996 births
Tanzanian footballers
Tanzania international footballers
Living people
Mtibwa Sugar F.C. players
Simba S.C. players
ENPPI SC players
Egyptian Premier League players
Tanzanian expatriate footballers
Expatriate footballers in Egypt
Tanzanian expatriate sportspeople in Egypt
Association football forwards
Tanzanian Premier League players